Lesaffre is a French yeast manufacturer, and the world's largest producer.

History
The company was founded by Louis Lesaffre, the co-founder of Bonduelle, in the mid-19th century.

One of its subsidiaries, Bio Springer, was founded by Baron Max de Springer in 1872 in Maisons-Alfort.

In 2004, it formed a North American joint-venture with Archer Daniels Midland, known as Red Star Yeast.

In 2007, it was the world's largest producer of yeast. In 2011 it bought the factory of "Voronezh Yeast" LLC in Voronezh.

After the foundation of the Lesaffre Advanced Fermentations (LEAF) subsidiary, the Swiss biofuel start-up Butalco, founded by Eckhard Boles and Gunter Festel, was acquired in July 2014. With this acquisition, Lesaffre entered the market for biobutanol.

In 2014, it had an annual turnover of 1.5 billion euros, 7,700 employees and 80 subsidiaries in various countries.

In 2021, it was ranked 8th on FoodTalks' list of Top 30 Global Probiotic Food Ingredient Companies.

References

Food and drink companies of France
French brands
Companies based in Hauts-de-France
Yeasts